Zsolt Óvári (born 29 March 1997) is a Hungarian professional footballer who plays for Győri ETO.

Club career
On 28 May 2021, Óvári signed a contract with Győri ETO for two years with an option for third.

Club statistics

Updated to games played as of 19 May 2019.

References

External links

1997 births
People from Kazincbarcika
Living people
Hungarian footballers
Hungary youth international footballers
Hungary under-21 international footballers
Association football forwards
Puskás Akadémia FC players
Puskás Akadémia FC II players
Diósgyőri VTK players
Balmazújvárosi FC players
Pécsi MFC players
Győri ETO FC players
Nemzeti Bajnokság I players
Nemzeti Bajnokság II players
Nemzeti Bajnokság III players
Sportspeople from Borsod-Abaúj-Zemplén County
21st-century Hungarian people